Live on the Double Planet is a live recording by guitarist Michael Hedges released on the Windham Hill label.

Reception

Music critic Jason Anderson, writing for Allmusic, wrote of the album "Throughout this wide-ranging effort, Hedges' incredible right hand keeps perfect time in its role as sole accompaniment for the musician's vocal work and simultaneous soloing... Too passionate to simply file under new age, Hedges displays all his originality and fiery musicianship on this first-rate live offering."

Track listing
All compositions by Michael Hedges except as noted.

 "All Along the Watchtower" (Bob Dylan) – 2:59
 "Because It's There" – 3:13
 "Silent Anticipations" – 3:01
 "Ready or Not" – 3:52
 "A Love Bizarre" (Prince, Sheila E.) – 4:30
 "Breakfast in the Field" – 2:17
 "Rikki's Shuffle" – 3:09
 "Woman of the World" – 4:28
 "The Double Planet" – 3:23
 "The Funky Avocado" – 3:20
 "Come Together" (John Lennon, Paul McCartney) – 5:10
 "Two Days Old" – 4:34

"The Funky Avocado" features a brief interpolation of The Rolling Stones' "Miss You". Hedges alludes to this in the introduction of the song, by telling the audience that it will feature a brief "disco" section.

Personnel
Michael Hedges – guitar, vocals
Michael Manring – fretless bass guitar on 7.

Production notes
Produced by Michael Hedges
Engineered by Harry Andronis, David Bianco, Hilleary Burgess
Mastered by Bernie Grundman

References 

Michael Hedges albums
1987 live albums
Windham Hill Records live albums